Mormaer Máel Coluim of Fife (1204–1228), or Maol Choluim anglicised as Malcolm, was one of the mormaers of Fife.
 
He married Matilda, the daughter of Gille Brigte, the mormaer of Strathearn. He is credited with the foundation of Culross Abbey. Upon the death of Máel Coluim I, probably in 1228, he was succeeded by his nephew Máel Coluim II, son of Máel Coluim I's brother Donnchadh, son of Donnchadh II.

Bibliography
 Bannerman, John, "MacDuff of Fife," in A. Grant & K.Stringer (eds.) Medieval Scotland: Crown, Lordship and Community, Essays Presented to G.W.S. Barrow,  (Edinburgh, 1993), pp. 20–38

References 

1228 deaths
Clan MacDuff
People from Fife
1204 births
Mormaers of Fife
13th-century mormaers